Sunfire is a superhero appearing in American comic books published by Marvel Comics. Sunfire is a mutant and sometime member of the X-Men.

Sunfire is a Japanese mutant who can generate superheated plasma and fly. Not suited for teamwork due to his temperament and arrogance, Sunfire was briefly a member of the X-Men and has kept limited ties to the team since.

Concept and creation
Roy Thomas recalled that, during his first run on X-Men,I wanted to add a young Japanese or Japanese-American whose mother had been at Hiroshima or Nagasaki as a corresponding character to the X-Men, whose parents were, at that time, assumed to have been at the Manhattan Project. Stan [Lee, X-Men editor/co-creator] didn't give me any good reason [for rejecting the character]—he just didn't want to, I think... I didn't bring it up again, but when I came back to the book, with Neal Adams, I created Sunfire, who is pretty much the character I had wanted to do some years earlier. I didn't make him an X-Man right away. By that time, Stan gave me a little more free . In fact, he was included in Giant Size X-Men #1, along with Banshee, precisely because I had gone around creating some 'international mutants,' with the goal of expanding the team at some time. I thought the X-Men shouldn't all be white Americans.

Thomas later commented on the character's costume "I had Don Heck design the character from my verbal suggestion of a costume that was an embodiment of the imperial Japanese Rising Sun flag, as Japanese or Japanese-American.

Publication history

Created by writer Roy Thomas and artist Don Heck, Sunfire first appeared in X-Men #64 (January 1970).

In 1998, Marvel published the miniseries Sunfire and Big Hero Six, presenting Sunfire's brief membership in a new superhero team sanctioned by the Japanese government.

Writer Rick Remender included Sunfire as a member of the Uncanny Avengers, starting with issue #5.

Fictional character biography
Shiro Yoshida was born in Agarashima, Japan. His mother suffered radiation poisoning due to exposure to the atomic bomb dropped on Hiroshima; as a result, Shiro was born as a mutant possessing solar radiation powers.

Shiro's mother died of radiation poisoning when he was young. Shiro grew to hate the United States, despite the influence of his father, an ambassador to the United Nations who was more tolerant of the US. Shiro's greedy uncle Tomo inspired him to become "Sunfire" and engage in a one-man battle against the U.S. As Sunfire, he attacked the United States Capitol and battled the X-Men, after which he witnessed Tomo murder his father; distraught, he killed Tomo and surrendered to the authorities.

Sunfire battled Namor the Sub-Mariner but then fought alongside him against the Dragon Lord. Sunfire also fought Iron Man but was abducted by the Mandarin and used to power one of the Mandarin's machines. Once freed, he and Iron Man fought Ultimo.

Professor X recruited Sunfire to a new team of X-Men to rescue the originals from Krakoa the Living Island. However, after the mission, he rejected X-Men membership.

Although Sunfire has had one solo story in the anthology Marvel Comics Presents, Sunfire has appeared mainly in stories teamed with other characters:
 With Iron Man and the second Guardsman
 With the X-Men 
 Among the heroes summoned by the Grandmaster for the first Contest of Champions
 With the X-Men
 Alongside Cable, Wolverine, and the New Mutants
 Hawkeye, Namor, and Spider-Woman.
 With the X-Men, against the inhabitants of the Void
 With Gambit versus the Hand.

Sunfire becomes involved with the X-Men once again when Apocalypse kidnaps him, as Sunfire is one of the Twelve, a group of unique mutants Apocalypse required to obtain reality-warping powers.  Sunfire then became a member of the Mumbai branch of X-Corporation, a non-government organization devoted to the protection of mutant rights.

During the early story arcs of the latest edition of Marvel Team-Up, Sunfire attempts to combat the powerful villain known as Titannus, a reject of the Super-Skrull program who had made his way to Earth after being brainwashed by an alien race to serve as their ultimate weapon. Attempting to contain Titannus, Sunfire summons practically the entire Japanese army to confront him, but the powerful foe defeats them army with ease, and is only barely beaten by a new team that had been hastily assembled by Doctor Strange to combat this threat.

Later, it was revealed that Sunfire had worked with Rogue and Mystique back when Sunfire was still working with Tomo and Rogue was a member of the Brotherhood of Mutants. Also working with them was a girl called Blindspot, who had the power to erase and restore memories. The four were on a mission to steal the process to bond adamantium from Lord Dark Wind, the father of Lady Deathstrike.

Since Blindspot always erased her tracks once a contract ended, she wipes the minds of everyone involved so no one would remember her.  Subsequently, Blindspot discovers Lord Dark Wind wanted all four dead for trying to steal his adamantium process. Realizing that the others would be in danger while having no memory of their mission, Blindspot went back to Japan to erase Lord Dark Wind's memory. When she got there, she discovered that his daughter (who later became Deathstrike) had already killed him. Blindspot erased Deathstrike's memories but, as Deathstrike was more machine than woman, Deathstrike was able to restore her own memories from an electronic backup. Deathstrike kidnapped Blindspot, who released a group photo of Sunfire, Rogue, and Mystique to attract their attention to save her. Rogue joined Sunfire, whose reputation had been ruined by the photograph, in Tokyo to discover why they were framed and who was responsible.  The two ran into Lady Deathstrike who, in a heated battle, cut off Sunfire's legs, leaving him in critical condition. Rogue surrendered to Deathstrike, who imprisoned the two. While imprisoned, Rogue met Blindspot, who restored Rogue's memories and explained what was going on.

When Deathstrike discovers that the three were not responsible for stealing the adamantium, she attempted kill them to destroy any evidence of what she had done. A weak Sunfire asks Rogue to absorb his powers so she could properly battle Deathstrike. Rogue had previously lost the powers of Carol Danvers that she had taken and was hesitant. She worries that she could harm Sunfire, but Blindspot pushes her on Sunfire's face, causing her to absorb all his powers and possibly killing him. With it, Rogue now also contains Sunfire's personality, similar to how she also once had Danvers' personality within her. With Sunfire's personality controlling her, Rogue seeks revenge on Deathstrike and severely injures the woman. The X-Men arrive in time to intervene, but Blindspot erases Rogue's memories of being an X-Man causing her to see her teammates as her enemies. After a brief altercation, Rogue's memories are restored and she tells the X-Men what had happened to Sunfire. They discover that his body is missing, leading some of the X-Men to believe he is somehow still alive.

Sunfire loses his powers before M-Day and his X-gene during that moment. It is revealed that Sunfire is rescued by a mysterious ninja group and taken to a hospital in Aspen. After being revived from his coma, the world's leading specialist in prosthetic limbs, Masanori Kuzuya, offers him his services. Before the reasoning behind the rescue is revealed, Apocalypse appears and offers Sunfire the chance for vengeance, as well as the recovery of his lost limbs and power, in return for his service as one of Apocalypse's new Horsemen. Sunfire accepts, but after being chained away and locked in a prison while listening to the tortured screams of Gazer (another of the new Horsemen), Sunfire tries to escape. Unable to leave Gazer to his fate, Sunfire attempts to free him. However, Gazer's transformation to the Horseman 'War' had already been completed and he attacks. Captured again, Sunfire is transformed into the Horseman of Famine. When Apocalypse launches his attack on the X-Men, Sunfire causes an intense feeling of hunger and weakness in the mutants and humans on the institute grounds. As he is fighting the X-Men, Havok shoots him down and Rogue, who recognizes him, catches him as he falls. He is taken to the Medical Lab and Emma Frost enters his mind to help him. When Apocalypse departs, he sends War to retrieve Famine, but Shiro breaks free from Apocalypse's control and attacks War.

Sunfire is seen running off with the unconscious body of Gambit, like him a former X-Men turned Horseman. At the temple where Sunfire first took Gambit, Mister Sinister tells them, "I am glad you both feel able to move on from the past... for I am your future!".

Sunfire is shown as a member of the Marauders still in the form of Famine. Alongside Gambit, Sunfire attacks Cable, who destroys Providence. He subsequently attacks an escaping Cannonball and Iceman, but is taken down by Cannonball and is taken prisoner. Though Cannonball and Iceman consider interrogating Sunfire for information as to who he is working for, Cannonball decides against it, knowing that Sunfire would never confess. Instead, Iceman neutralizes Sunfire's artificial mutant abilities on a sub-atomic level using his own mutant abilities, while Cannonball fights him.

Sunfire is later held captive in the Blackbird and is rescued by his fellow Marauders. After being rescued by the Marauders, Sunfire joins fellow members Gambit, Prism, Blockbuster, Malice, Lady Mastermind, and Scalphunter when they travel to Cooperstown, Alaska to find the Messiah baby but instead come across the Purifiers and they come to blows. He then participates in a battle alongside the Marauders and Acolytes against the X-Men.

The next time Sunfire is seen, he is with Gambit, Vertigo, and Malice at Eagle Plaza, Texas, taking on Bishop for the Messiah baby. He is involved in the battle at Muir Island over the mutant baby's fate. He is apparently knocked unconscious at some point, as it is revealed later that Bishop cauterized the wound of his severed arm by pressing it against Sunfire's unconscious but still flaming form. After Xavier was injured by Bishop, everyone went their separate ways, including the surviving members of the Marauders.

Avengers
Years later, Wolverine finds a drunken and disheveled Shiro in a Tokyo alleyway. Shiro is offered a spot on the new Avengers Unity Squad, with Wolverine stating that Professor X always thought he had potential. He is initially hesitant, but agrees to join the Avengers after learning that the Red Skull has stolen Xavier's brain.

Following a confrontation with the Celestial Exitar, who had come to judge Earth due to the machinations of the Apocalypse Twins, Sunfire was apparently killed by Kang the Conqueror, but he was able to use his power to transform his body into a state of pure energy that he could use to absorb most of the Celestials' energy.

Eight months after the events of "Secret Wars," Sunfire is back to his normal appearance. With the Terrigen Mist killing mutants across the globe, he takes a group of mutant survivors from Asia and attempts to get them to safety, only to end up trapped in Weirdworld.

Sunfire later represented the Japanese government when he attended Black Panther's meeting in the Eden Room of Avengers Mountain.

Family

Shiro Yoshida (Sunfire) is the brother of Leyu Yoshida, alias the superheroine Sunpyre, who shares his flame-based powers. He is also the cousin of Wolverine's late fiancée Mariko Yashida and her half-brother the Silver Samurai.

Yashida and Yoshida seem to be different spellings of the same name. While in his first appearance Sunfire was called Shiro Yoshida, he story arc that introduced his cousin, Mariko, his name was spelled Yashida and this version of the name was carried on in Mariko's next appearances.

Powers and abilities
Sunfire is a mutant with the ability to absorb solar radiation, and convert it to ionize matter into a fiery plasma state which bursts into flame when exposed to oxygen. Referring to his plasma output as "solar fire", he can release this energy through his hands as blasts of searing heat, deadly radiation, explosive concussive force, or simple flames. By ionizing the air around him, he can surround himself with an aura of heat intense enough to melt steel, or fly by focusing his aura downwards in a tight stream of ionized gas to propel him through the air like a rocket. Sunfire can see heat, by shifting his vision from visible light to infrared.  Sunfire has the ability to form a psionic force field while using his plasma as protection from heat and radiation, both that of his own generation and that from outside sources. In a similar fashion to the Human Torch's nova burst, Sunfire is capable of increasing his plasma output to temperatures around 1,000,000 degrees Fahrenheit, and emitting it as an omnidirectional blast.

Sunfire transferred his powers to Rogue in order to defeat Lady Deathstrike who had just cut off his legs. This (like Ms. Marvel before him) left him still a mutant but powerless. After his transformation into Famine, a Horseman of Apocalypse, his powers and legs were returned, and he could now also use them to create flashes of light that affected the sections of the human brain which control hunger, causing any people who saw his light flashes to feel as if they were starving. Due to further genetic enhancement from Apocalypse, Sunfire is also able to secrete a specialized bio-oxygen from his skin, which allows him to breathe and conjure his flames even in the vacuum of space.

Shiro also seems to be quite an accomplished martial artist. He has displayed impressive hand to hand skills on several occasions and stated that he didn't need to employ his powers in order to defeat Hand ninjas. He is trained in karate, judo, and kendo (Japanese Samurai swordsmanship). He is also an expert in the combat use of his superhuman powers. He has at least peak human physical ability.

Reception
 In 2014, Entertainment Weekly ranked Sunfire 41st in their "Let's rank every X-Man ever" list.
 In 2020, CBR.com ranked Sunfire 2nd in their "Marvel Comics: Ranking Every Member Of Big Hero 6 From Weakest To Most Powerful" list.

Other versions

Age of Apocalypse
In Age of Apocalypse, Japan was destroyed by Holocaust, one of the Horsemen of Apocalypse. Shiro, a survivor of the massacre, was captured and given to Maximus (the Horseman of Death), as a test subject for his experiments. Shiro's powers were pushed to their limits, causing his whole body to be set aflame, injuring him as a result. Shiro was rescued by the X-Men and joined them, taking on the codename Sunfire. Sunfire wore a containment suit to control his powers, although he was constantly on fire. Haunted by the destruction of his nation, Sunfire joined Rogue's task force of X-Men when they were sent to Chicago to fight Holocaust, who had begun a new series of Cullings. The character design of the original Sunfire as Famine (see above) is virtually identical to the Age of Apocalypse incarnation of the character.

After the regular reality's X-Force crossed over into the Age of Apocalypse, Shiro was one of the few X-Men to return in order to prevent the destruction of Earth-616 by Archangel. Though he fought valiantly against the traitorous Iceman, seemingly killing him for his treachery, Shiro was killed while attempting to siphon energy from Holocaust's weapon of mass destruction, though he managed to buy X-Force precious moments with his sacrifice.

Age of X-Man
In the Age of X-Man reality, Shiro Yoshida is the Civil Management Instructor of the 10th Year class within the Summers Institute Of Higher Learning, located in Winchester, NY.

House of M
In the House of M reality, Sunfire became the Emperor of Japan. Under his rule, the country had prospered, though the poverty levels were extremely high among the baseline human population. In secret, Sunfire was one of the masterminds of Project: Genesis, a project sanctioned by the Japan branch of S.H.I.E.L.D. with the goal of forcefully mutating baseline humans. When the S.H.I.E.L.D. operatives-in-training dubbed the Hellions investigated a terrorist attack, they discovered the existence of Project: Genesis and its link to Emperor Sunfire. Sunfire lied to the Hellions and told them that Project: Genesis's purpose was to recycle organic waste into food for poor baseline humans.

Marvel Zombies
In Marvel Zombies, a zombie version of Sunfire and Silver Samurai can be briefly seen slaughtering civilians, while the Silver Surfer travels the globe, as a result of Quicksilver being infected and thus able to spread the zombie plague all over the world. The zombie version of Wolverine traveled to Earth-Z, where at Marvel Zombies Return, seeks an uninfected Sunfire that battles Zombie Wolverine, but was killed instead.

Ultimate Marvel
In Ultimate X-Men #94, Sunfire appears as a member of Alpha Flight. His power levels enhanced by Banshee, the Ultimate Marvel version of the Mutant Growth Hormone, he squares off against new X-Man recruit Firestar.

In other media

Television
 Sunfire appears in a self-titled episode of Spider-Man and His Amazing Friends, voiced by Jerry Dexter. He falls in love with Firestar while working with her, Spider-Man, and Iceman, unaware that his uncle Jin Ju seeks to use Sunfire and Firestar to create a fire monster. After foiling Jin's plot, Sunfire returns to Japan to help him recover.
 Sunfire makes primarily non-speaking cameo appearances in X-Men: The Animated Series, voiced by Denis Akiyama.
 Sunfire appears in Marvel Disk Wars: The Avengers, voiced by Tomokazu Sugita in the Japanese version and Yuri Lowenthal in the English version.

Video games

 Sunfire appears as a playable character in X-Men Legends II: Rise of Apocalypse voiced by James Sie.
 Sunfire appears in X-Men: Destiny, voiced by Gaku Space. This version is the father of game-original character Aimi Yoshida.
 Sunfire appears as an unlockable character in Marvel: Avengers Alliance.

Influence
 In an interview in Wizard Magazine, Alex Ross has mentioned that Sunfire's mask served as the inspiration for Kyle Rayner's (Green Lantern) original costume mask, which debuted in Green Lantern #51 (in 1994).

See also
 Sunfire (Exiles)

References

External links
 Sunfire at Marvel.com
 UncannyXmen.net Spotlight on Sunfire and family tree
 Shiro Yoshida at Marvel Wiki

Avengers (comics) characters
Big Hero 6 characters
Characters created by Don Heck
Characters created by Roy Thomas
Comics characters introduced in 1970
Fictional characters with fire or heat abilities
Japanese superheroes
Marvel Comics male superheroes
Marvel Comics martial artists
Marvel Comics mutants
Marvel Comics mutates
X-Men members